The Cleveland Society of Artists was a Cleveland, Ohio artists group founded in March, 1913 by George Adomeit and Charles Shackleton to continue the traditions of academic art. Both founders had been members of The Arts Club of Cleveland. The society was for many years a staunch rival to the Bohemian Kokoon Arts Club. It disbanded in September, 1983.

See also
Cleveland School (arts community)
Cleveland Artists Foundation

References

External links
 The Cleveland Museum of Art
 The Cleveland Institute of Art
 Cleveland Artists Foundation

American artist groups and collectives
Cleveland School (arts community)
Arts organizations based in Ohio
Organizations based in Cleveland
Arts organizations established in 1913
Arts organizations disestablished in 1983
1913 establishments in Ohio
1983 disestablishments in Ohio